William C. Denny Jr. (born August 22, 1930) is an American politician and former member of the Mississippi House of Representatives. He was the floor leader of the Republicans in the house when in office.

Denny is an alumnus of the University of Maryland and retired business executive and banker. He is a retired Senior Vice President of Southeastern Operations of a multi-national banking corporation.

Elected to the Mississippi House of Representatives in 1988, he served District 64, encompassing Hinds County and Madison County. He served on the Apportionment and Elections as chairman, and as member of the appropriations, congressional redistricting, constitution, Judiciary A,  Judiciary En Banc, legislative reapportionment and municipalities committees.

In November 2019, Denny was defeated by Shanda Yates. The race was extremely close, with Yates winning by a margin of less than 150 votes (50.8% to 49.2%), and results took nearly two weeks to certify. His term ended on January 7, 2020.

He is married to Sue Rose Johnsey, and with her has four children. He is Catholic.

References

1930 births
21st-century American politicians
Living people
Republican Party members of the Mississippi House of Representatives